Yuka Kaneko (née Yuka Yoshida, born 1 April 1976) is a former professional tennis player from Japan.

In her career, she won three doubles titles on the WTA Tour: 1995 in Tokyo, 1996 in Pattaya, and 2005 in Memphis.

Kaneko also won five singles and seven doubles titles on the ITF Circuit.

Her best Grand Slam performance came in 1998 when she reached the quarterfinals of the doubles tournament of the US Open.

WTA career finals

Singles: 1 (runner-up)

Doubles: 5 (3 titles, 2 runner-ups)

ITF Circuit finals

Singles: 10 (5–5)

Doubles: 15 (7–8)

References

External links
 
 

1976 births
Living people
Japanese female tennis players
Sportspeople from Yokohama
Sportspeople from Kanagawa Prefecture
Sportspeople from Tottori Prefecture
Asian Games medalists in tennis
Tennis players at the 1998 Asian Games
Tennis players at the 2002 Asian Games
Medalists at the 1998 Asian Games
Medalists at the 2002 Asian Games
Asian Games silver medalists for Japan
Asian Games bronze medalists for Japan
20th-century Japanese women
21st-century Japanese women